Burton Constable railway station was a railway station which served the villages of Marton and Burton Constable in the East Riding of Yorkshire, England. It was on the Hull and Hornsea Railway.

It opened on 28 March 1864 as "Marton", but was renamed "Burton Constable" on 1 August 1864, to avoid confusion with various other Martons elsewhere. It was renamed again (to avoid confusion with Constable Burton on the Wensleydale Railway), on 1 January 1922 and became known as "Ellerby". It closed following the Beeching Report on 19 October 1964.

References

External links

 Ellerby station on navigable 1947 O. S. map

Disused railway stations in the East Riding of Yorkshire
Former North Eastern Railway (UK) stations
Railway stations in Great Britain opened in 1864
Railway stations in Great Britain closed in 1964
Beeching closures in England
Hull and Hornsea Railway